Nemophora minimella is a moth of the Adelidae family. It is found in most of Europe, except Estonia, Ukraine, Slovenia, Switzerland and Portugal.

Adult males have antennae which are almost twice the wing length, while those of the female are just over one wing length. Head in males black, in female ferruginous. Forewings golden-bronzy, becoming coppery posteriorly, base more brassy ; a blackish basal dash beneath costa ; a very obscurely marked violet -brownish postmedian shade. Hindwings dark purplish - fuscous, in male sometimes whitish except apex.. 

They are on wing in July and fly during the day.

The larvae feed on Succisa pratensis and Scabiosa columbaria. They first feed on the seeds. Later, they feed on the lower leaves from within a portable case.

References

External links
lepiforum.de
 Images representing Nemophora minimella at Consortium for the Barcode of Life

Moths described in 1775
Adelidae
Moths of Europe